Edgard Edouard Pisani (9 October 1918 – 20 June 2016) was a French statesman, philosopher, and writer.

He was a European Commissioner and Member of the European Parliament.

Biography
Pisani was born in Tunis, French Tunisia, of French parents of Maltese origin. He spent his childhood in Tunisia and later studied in Paris. Pisani holds a "licence de lettres" from La Sorbonne, and a Doctorate in political science.

A résistant and significant protagonist of the Liberation of Paris in August 1944, he held positions in various governments in France: Senator (1954–1961), (1974–1981), Minister of Agriculture (1961–1966), Parliamentarian (1967–1968), European Commissioner (1981–1985), Minister of New Caledonia (1985), President of the Arab World Institute (1988–1995). In 1992, with Bertrand Hervieu, he formed the Groupe de Seillac followed in 1995 by the Groupe de Bruges, both being think tanks specialising in agricultural and rural affairs. Since 1992 he has been a member of the French Economic and Social Council. In 1993 he was awarded an Honorary Degree (Doctor of Laws) by the University of Bath. The Fonds Edgard Pisani are available in the Archives nationales of France.
Pisani also served on the Agri-Energy Roundtable (AER)'s Committee of Honor, a UN accredited non-governmental organisation chaired by US Senator Jennings Randolph (D)-WV).

He died on 20 June 2016 at the age of 97.

Books 

 Principes: Project de Déclaration, éd. Librairie de Médicis, 1946.
 La Région… pour quoi faire ou le Triomphe des Jacondins, éd. Calmann-Lévy, 1969.
 Le Général indivis , éd. Albin Michel, 1974.
 Utopie foncière, préface de Michel Rocard, éd. Gallimard, 1977.
 Socialiste de raison, éd. Flammarion, 1978.
 Défi du monde, éd. Ramsay, 1979.
 La Main Et L'outil, éd. Robert Laffont, 1984.
 Pour l'Afrique, éd. Odile Jacob, 1988.
 Persiste et signe, éd. Odile Jacob, 1992.
 "Pour une agriculture marchande et ménagère, La Tour de l'Aube", éd. Charles Léopold Mayer, 1994.
 Entre le marché et les besoins des hommes. Agriculture et sécurité alimentaire mondiale (avec Pierre-Yves Guihéneuf), éd. Charles Léopold Mayer, 1996.
 La Passion de L'Etat, éd. Arléa, 1998. 
 Une Certaine Idée du Monde: L'utopie comme méthode, éd. Seuil, 2001.
 Un vieil homme et la terre, éd. Seuil, 2004.
 Vive la révolte ! Un vieil homme et la politique, éd. Seuil, 2006.
 Une politique mondiale pour nourrir le monde, éd. Springer, 2007.
 Le Sens de l'État, Éditions de l'Aube, 2008.
 Mes mots: Pistes à réflexion, éd. de l'Aube, 2013.
 Croire pour vivre: méditations politiques, éd. Saint-Léger Éditions, 2015.

Films 
 2011 C'est beau la politique, vous savez!, un film documentaire de Jean Jacques Rault

References

1918 births
2016 deaths
High Commissioners of New Caledonia
Writers from Tunis
Tunisian emigrants to France
French Ministers of Agriculture
French people of Maltese descent
Senators of Haute-Marne
European Commissioners 1981–1985